Tomáš Kostka (born 27 August 1984) is a Czech racing driver, who lives in Beausoleil, Alpes-Maritimes.

Racing career
Kostka raced in Formula Ford and the Ford Puma Cup in 2001. He raced in Formula BMW ADAC and Austrian F3 the following year. He moved onto the more competitive Recaro F3 Cup in 2003. He combined another year there in 2004 with races in the World Series by Nissan and Euro Formula 3000 championship. He carried on in Formula Renault 3.5 Series for another two seasons, amassing a total of 12 points. He moved into touring cars in the Czech series, racing an Audi A4 DTM, in which he won the 2008 Sprint championship.

Kostka raced for A1 Team Czech Republic at the first round of the 2006–07 A1 Grand Prix season at Circuit Park Zandvoort. He also competed in the 2007 24 Hours of Le Mans in a Ferrari 550-GTS Maranello for Convers MenX Racing, finishing 14th overall.

His performances in his national series were enough to be signed by Colin Kolles to drive a two-year-old Audi A4 for his DTM team for 2009.

Racing record

Career summary

Complete Formula Renault 3.5 Series results 
(key) (Races in bold indicate pole position) (Races in italics indicate fastest lap)

† Driver did not finish the race, but was classified as he completed more than 90% of the race distance.

24 Hours of Le Mans results

Complete DTM results
(key) (Races in bold indicate pole position) (Races in italics indicate fastest lap)

WRC results

Complete EuroV8 Series results
(key) (Races in bold indicate pole position) (Races in italics indicate fastest lap)

References

External links

Deutsche Tourenwagen Masters drivers
1984 births
Living people
Czech racing drivers
Formula Ford drivers
European Rally Championship drivers
A1 Team Czech Republic drivers
Auto GP drivers
24 Hours of Le Mans drivers
Formula BMW ADAC drivers
World Series Formula V8 3.5 drivers
German Formula Three Championship drivers
International Formula Master drivers
Audi Sport drivers
ISR Racing drivers
RC Motorsport drivers
Charouz Racing System drivers
Draco Racing drivers
Kolles Racing drivers